Emalahleni Local Municipality is the name of two different local municipalities in South Africa:
 Emalahleni Local Municipality, Eastern Cape
 Emalahleni Local Municipality, Mpumalanga